HMS Ladybird was an  of the Royal Navy, launched in 1916. This class are also referred to as "large China gunboats". Originally built to patrol the River Danube during the First World War, she sailed for China from Malta in February 1927 to serve on the Yangtze River.

History
On 12 December 1937, Ladybird, along with   became involved in the Panay incident and came under fire from a Japanese artillery unit near Wuhu on the Yangtze River. Ladybird was hit by six shells and Bee dodged one as she came upon the scene. Ladybird was not badly damaged and with Bee picked up survivors from the sunk .

In 1939 the original pair of  Mk VII 45-calibre guns were replaced by more modern and  longer 6-inch Mk XIII 50-calibre guns from the decommissioned battleship .

Ladybird was allocated to Singapore in 1940 and then, along with five others of the class, stripped down and towed to the Mediterranean Sea. During the journey she sustained damage which meant she was limited to a speed of  due to a misaligned hull. She was initially used to guard Port Said.

In late December 1940 and early January 1941 Ladybird was engaged at close range, bombarding the Italian port of Bardia in Libya, in support of the Allied Capture of Bardia on 5 January 1941 as part of Operation Compass.

On 25 February 1941 she landed a Royal Marines unit during  Operation Abstention, an ill-fated attempt to seize the Italian island of Kastelorizo, where she was hit by an aerial bomb. Later, acting in support of the Tobruk garrison, she shelled the Gazala airfield and ferried in supplies. Still above water, her  gun was used as an anti-aircraft gun;  replaced Ladybird in supporting Tobruk.

External links

 History of Yangtze River Patrol

 

Ladybird
Gunboats sunk by aircraft
World War II shipwrecks in the Mediterranean Sea
1916 ships
Maritime incidents in May 1941
Maritime incidents in Libya
Ships sunk by German aircraft